The international Group of Seven (G7) is an intergovernmental political forum consisting of Canada, France, Germany, Italy, Japan, the United Kingdom and the United States; additionally, the European Union (EU) is a "non-enumerated member". It is officially organized around shared values of pluralism and representative government, with members making up the world's largest IMF advanced economies and liberal democracies. As of 2020, G7 members account for over half of global net wealth (at over $200 trillion), 32 to 46 percent of global gross domestic product, and 10 percent of the world's population (770 million people). Members are great powers in global affairs and maintain mutually close political, economic, diplomatic, and military relations.

Originating from an ad hoc gathering of finance ministers in 1973, the G7 has since become a formal, high-profile venue for discussing and coordinating solutions to major global issues, especially in the areas of trade, security, economics, and climate change. Each member's head of government or state, along with the EU's Commission President and Council President, meet annually at the G7 Summit; other high-ranking officials of the G7 and the EU meet throughout the year. Representatives of other states and international organizations are often invited as guests, with Russia having been a formal member (as part of the Group of Eight) from 1997 to 2014.

The G7 is not based on a treaty and has no permanent secretariat or office. It is organized through a presidency that rotates annually among the member states, with the presiding state setting the group's priorities and hosting and organizing its summit; Germany currently presides for 2022. While lacking a legal or institutional basis, the G7 is widely considered to wield significant international influence; it has catalyzed or spearheaded several major global initiatives, including efforts to combat the HIV/AIDS pandemic, provide financial aid to developing countries, and address climate change through the 2015 Paris Agreement. However, the group has been criticized by observers for its allegedly outdated and limited membership, narrow global representation, and ineffectualness. It is also opposed by anti-globalization groups, which often protest at summits.

History

Origins 
The concept of a forum for the capitalist world's major industrialized countries emerged before the 1973 oil crisis. On 25 March 1973, the U.S. Secretary of the Treasury, George Shultz, convened an informal gathering of finance ministers from West Germany (Helmut Schmidt), France (Valéry Giscard d'Estaing), and the United Kingdom (Anthony Barber) before an upcoming meeting in Washington, D.C. U.S. President Richard Nixon offered the White House as a venue, and the meeting was subsequently held in its library on the ground floor; the original group of four consequently became known as the "Library Group". In mid-1973, at the Spring Meetings of the International Monetary Fund and the World Bank, Shultz proposed the addition of Japan, which all members accepted. The informal gathering of senior financial officials from the U.S., U.K., West Germany, Japan, and France became known as the "Group of Five".

In 1974, all five members endured sudden and often troubled changes in leadership. French President Georges Pompidou abruptly died, leading to a fresh presidential election that was closely won by Valéry Giscard d'Estaing. West German Chancellor Willy Brandt, American President Richard Nixon, and Japanese Prime Minister Kakuei Tanaka all resigned due to scandals. In the United Kingdom, a hung election led to a minority government whose subsequent instability prompted another election the same year. Consequently, Nixon's successor, Gerald Ford, proposed a retreat the following year for the group's new leaders to learn about one another.

First summit and expansion 
At the initiative of Giscard d'Estaing and his German counterpart, Helmut Schmidt, France hosted a three-day summit in November 1975, inviting the Group of Five plus Italy, forming the "Group of Six" (G6). Taking place at the Château de Rambouillet, the meeting focused on several major economic issues, including the oil crisis, the collapse of the Bretton Woods system, and the ongoing global recession. The result was the 15-point "Declaration of Rambouillet", which, among other positions, announced the group's united commitment to promoting free trade, multilateralism, cooperation with the developing world, and rapprochement with the Eastern Bloc. The members also established plans for future gatherings to take place regularly every year.

In 1976, British Prime Minister Harold Wilson, who had participated in the first G6 summit, resigned from office; Schmidt and Ford believed the group needed an English speaker with more political experience, and advocated for inviting Pierre Trudeau, who had been Prime Minister of Canada for eight yearssignificantly longer than any G6 leader. Canada was also the next largest advanced economy after the G6 members. The summit in Dorado, Puerto Rico later that year became the first of the current Group of Seven (G7).

In 1977, the United Kingdom, which hosted that year's summit, invited the European Economic Community to join all G7 summits; beginning in 1981, it had attended every gathering through the president of the European Commission and the leader of the country holding the presidency of the Council of the European Union. Since 2009, the then-newly established position of the President of the European Council, who serves as the Union's principal foreign representative, also regularly attends the summits.

Rising profile 
Until the 1985 Plaza Accord, meetings between the seven governments' finance ministers were not public knowledge. The Accord, which involved only the original Group of Five, was announced the day before it was finalized, with a communiqué issued afterwards. The 1980s also marked the G7's expanded concerns beyond macroeconomic issues, namely with respect to international security and conflict; for example, it sought to address the ongoing conflicts between Iran and Iraq and between the Soviet Union and Afghanistan.

Following the 1994 summit in Naples, Russian officials held separate meetings with leaders of the G7. This informal arrangement was dubbed the "Political 8" (P8), colloquially the G7+1. At the invitation of the G7 leaders, Russian President Boris Yeltsin was invited first as a guest observer, later as a full participant. After the 1997 meeting, Russia was formally invited to the next meeting and formally joined the group in 1998, resulting in the Group of Eight (G8). Russia was an outlier in the group, as it lacked the national wealth and financial weight of other members, had never been a major advanced economy, and was not yet an established liberal democracy. Its invitation, made during a difficult transition to a post-communist economy, is believed to have been motivated by a desire to encourage its political and economic reforms and international engagement.

Russia's membership was suspended in March 2014 in response to its annexation of Crimea. Members stopped short of permanently ejecting the country, and in subsequent years expressed an openness or express desire to reinstate Russian participation. Nevertheless, Russia announced its permanent departure in 2017; the following year, the G7 announced further sanctions on the country for its intervention in Ukraine. In 2020, U.S. President Donald Trump, backed by Italian Prime Minister Giuseppe Conte, advocated for Russia's return; all other members rejected the proposal, and Russia expressed no interest.

Renewed calls for expanded membership 
There have been various proposals to expand the G7. The U.S.-based Atlantic Council has held the D-10 Strategy Forum since 2014 with representatives from what it calls "leading democracies" which support a "rules-based democratic order", consisting of all members of the G7 (including the European Union) plus Australia and South Korea. Several democratic countriesincluding India, Indonesia, Poland, and Spain participate as observers. Centered around a similar mandate as the G7, the D-10 has been considered by some analysts to be an alternative to the group; This is also favored by various think tanks and former British leader Boris Johnson.

In 2019 under Putin, Russia had signaled support for the inclusion of China, India, and Turkey if the G7 had reinstated the Russian membership.

In 2020 under Trump, the U.S. had signaled support for the inclusion of Australia, Brazil, India, and South Korea, plus the reincorporation of Russia.

Also in November 2020, Jared Cohen and Richard Fontaine, writing in Foreign Affairs, suggested that the G7 might be expanded to a "T-12" of "Techno Democracies". Earlier, in June of that same year, the Global Partnership on Artificial Intelligence (GPAI) was announced. Something of a spin-out of the G7, founded by members Canada and France, GPAI's initial membership was 15, including both the EU and India, as well as Australia, Mexico, New Zealand, Singapore, Slovenia, and the Republic of Korea.

Boris Johnson invited members Australia and the Republic of Korea to the June 2021 G7 summit. India was also invited to the 2021 summit, so as to "deepen the expertise and experience around the table" along with the other guests, according to a U.K. government statement.

In 2021, French jurist and consultant Eric Garner de Béville, a member of the Cercle Montesquieu, proposed Spain's membership to the G7. American Chargé d'Affaires in Spain, Conrad Tribble, stated that the United States "enthusiastically supports" a "greater" role of Spanish leadership at the international level.

In 2022, Germany has confirmed it will be inviting India, against rumours to the contrary. Japan confirmed that it intends to invite South Korea's president, Yoon Suk-yeol, to the 2023 summit it is hosting in Hiroshima. Australia, India, and Indonesia are also expected to be invited by Japan to the 2023 summit.

Activities and initiatives

The G7 was founded primarily to facilitate shared macroeconomic initiatives in response to contemporary economic problems; the first gathering was centered around the Nixon shock, the 1970s energy crisis, and the ensuing global recession. Since 1975, the group has met annually at summits organized and hosted by whichever country occupies the annually-rotating presidency; since 1987, the G7 Finance Ministers have met at least semi-annually, and up to four times a year at stand-alone meetings.

Beginning in the 1980s, the G7 broadened its areas of concern to include issues of international security, human rights, and global security; for example, during this period, the G7 concerned itself with the ongoing Iran-Iraq War and Soviet occupation of Afghanistan. In the 1990s, it launched a debt-relief program for the 42 heavily indebted poor countries (HIPC); provided $300 million to help build the Shelter Structure over the damaged reactor at Chernobyl; and established the Financial Stability Forum to help in "managing the international monetary system".

At the turn of the 21st century, the G7 began emphasizing engagement with the developing world. At the 1999 summit, the group helped launch the G20, a similar forum made up of the G7 and the next 13 largest economies (including the European Union), in order to "promote dialogue between major industrial and emerging market countries"; the G20 has been touted by some of its members as a replacement for the G7. Having previously announced a plan to cancel 90% of bilateral debt for the HIPC, totaling $100 billion, in 2005 the G7 announced debt reductions of "up to 100%" to be negotiated on a "case by case" basis.

Following the global financial crisis of 2007–2008, which was the worst of its kind since the 1970s, the G7 met twice in Washington, D.C. in 2008 and in Rome the following February. News media reported that much of the world was looking to the group for leadership and solutions. G7 finance ministers pledged to take "all necessary steps" to stem the crisis, devising an "aggressive action plan" that included providing publicly funded capital infusions to banks in danger of failing. Some analysts criticized the group for seemingly advocating that individual governments develop their own responses to the recession, rather than cohere around a united effort.

In subsequent years, the G7 has faced several geopolitical challenges that have led some international analysts to question its credibility, or propose its replacement by the G20. On 2 March 2014, the G7 condemned the Russian Federation for its "violation of the sovereignty and territorial integrity of Ukraine" through its military intervention. The group also announced its commitment to "mobilize rapid technical assistance to support Ukraine in addressing its macroeconomic, regulatory and anti-corruption challenges", while adding that the International Monetary Fund (IMF) was best suited to stabilizing the country's finances and economy.

In response to Russia's subsequent annexation of Crimea, on 24 March the G7 convened an emergency meeting at the official residence of the Prime Minister of the Netherlands, the Catshuis in The Hague; this location was chosen because all G7 leaders were already present to attend the 2014 Nuclear Security Summit hosted by the Netherlands. This was the first G7 meeting neither taking place in a member state nor having the host leader participating in the meeting. The upcoming G8 summit in Sochi, Russia was moved to Brussels, where the EU was the host. On 5 June 2014 the G7 condemned Moscow for its "continuing violation" of Ukraine's sovereignty and stated they were prepared to impose further sanctions on Russia. This meeting was the first since Russia was suspended from the G8, and subsequently it has not been involved in any G7 summit.

The G7 has continued to take a strong stance against Russia's "destabilising behaviour and malign activities" in Ukraine and elsewhere around the world, following the joint communique from the June 2021 summit in the U.K. The group also called on Russia to address international cybercrime attacks launched from within its borders, and to investigate the use of chemical weapons on Russian opposition leader Alexei Navalny. The June 2021 summit also saw the G7 commit to helping the world recover from the global COVID-19 pandemic (including plans to help vaccinate the entire world); encourage further action against climate change and biodiversity loss; and promote "shared values" of pluralism and democracy.

In 2022, G7 leaders were invited to attend an extraordinary summit of NATO called in response to the 2022 Russian invasion of Ukraine.

Decarbonization of electricity 
At the conclusion of G7 meeting in Berlin in May 2022, the climate, energy and environment ministers made a new pledge to decarbonize electricity sectors by 2035. They also committed to an eventual phase out of coal power generation but did not gave a deadline when. Their decision was based on the backdrop of the ongoing Russo-Ukrainian War which has given a renewed sense of urgency to expedite the transition to cleaner energy source. This decision will also be pitched to a wider G20 group which together produce 80% of the world's greenhouse gas emissions. Phil Macdonald, Chief operating officer of the climate and energy research group Ember said "the science shows that decarbonizing electricity by 2035 is the quickest and cheapest way to Net Zero".

Summit organization 
The annual G7 summit is attended by each member's head of government. The member country holding the G7 presidency is responsible for organizing and hosting the year's summit. The serial annual summits can be parsed chronologically in arguably distinct ways, including as the sequence of host countries for the summits has recurred over time and series. Generally every country hosts the summit once every seven years.

Besides a main meeting in June or July a number of other meetings may take place throughout the year; in 2021 for example, seven tracks existed for finance (4–5 June 2021), environmental (20 and 21 May 2021), health (3–4 June 2021), trade (27–28 May 2021), interior (7–9 September 2021) digital and technology (28–29 April 2021), development (3–5 May 2021) and foreign ministers.

List of summits

Country leaders and EU representatives (as of 2023)

Current leaders

Member country data
The G7 is composed of the seven wealthiest advanced countries. The People's Republic of China, according to its data, would be the second-largest with 17.90% of the world net wealth, but is excluded because of its relatively low net wealth per adult and Human Development Index. As of 2021, Crédit Suisse reports the G7 (without the European Union) represents around 53% of the global net wealth; including the EU, the G7 accounts for over 60% of the global net wealth.

Criticism and controversy

2014 suspension and subsequent exclusion of Russia

In March 2014 Russia was suspended by G7 members from the political forum G8 following the annexation of Crimea. In January 2017, Russia announced it would permanently leave the G8, which came into effect June 2018.

2015 protests

About 7,500 protesters led by the group 'Stop-G7' demonstrated during the summit. About 300 of those reached the 3 m high and 7 km long security fence surrounding the summit location. The protesters questioned the legitimacy of the G7 to make decisions that could affect the whole world. Authorities had banned demonstrations in the area closest to the summit location and 20,000 police were on duty in Southern Bavaria to keep activists and protesters from interfering with the summit.

2018 Trump conflict over tariffs and Russia

The 2018 meeting in Charlevoix, Canada, was marred by fractious negotiations concerning tariffs and Donald Trump's position that Russia should be reinstated to the G7. The Trump administration had just imposed steel and aluminium tariffs on many countries, including European countries that are fellow members of the G7, and Canada, the host country for the 2018 meeting. Trump expressed dismay at Canadian Prime Minister Justin Trudeau for holding a press conference in which Canada restated its position on tariffs (a public criticism of Trump's economic policy), and directed his representatives at the meeting not to sign the economic section of the joint communiqué that is typically issued at the conclusion of the meeting.
German Chancellor Angela Merkel described Trump's behaviour as a "depressing withdrawal," while French President Emmanuel Macron invited him "to be serious." In the final statement signed by all members except the US, the G7 announced its intention to recall sanctions and to be ready to take further restrictive measures within the next months against the Russian Federation for its failure to completely implement the Minsk Agreement.

Trump repeated calls for Russia to be re-admitted to the group at the 2019 meeting in Biarritz, saying it should be included in discussions relating to Iran, Syria, and North Korea. The Italian Prime Minister Giuseppe Conte supported Trump's proposal, Shinzo Abe of Japan was neutral, and the rest of the G7 pushed back against the suggestion, after which the atmosphere allegedly became "tense".

2019 Amazon rainforest fires and Brazil 

U.S. President Donald Trump's reiteration that Russia should be readmitted to the group (see above), the instigation of a trade war with China, increased tensions in Iran, Trump's alleged reluctance to attend the conference, and a number of international crises made the 2019 G7 meeting in Biarritz, France, the most divided since its inception. Following President Trump's previous revocation of his signature to a joint communiqué agreed to in 2018 due to an alleged slight from Canadian Prime Minister Justin Trudeau (see above), French President Emmanuel Macron agreed that the group would not issue a joint communiqué at the Biarritz conference.

The G7 nations pledged US$20 million to help Brazil and other countries in South America fight the wildfires. This money was welcomed, although it was widely seen as a "relatively small amount" given the scale of the problem.  Macron threatened to block a major trade deal between the European Union and Brazil (Mercosur) that would benefit the agricultural interests accused of driving deforestation.

See also

 List of G7 leaders
 Build Back Better World
 Developed country
 E7 (countries)
 G4 (EU)
 G6 (EU)
 G8
 G8+5
 G10 currencies
 Group of Twelve (G12)
 G20
 List of country groupings
 List of multilateral free-trade agreements
 Quint
 Great power
 Junior 8

Notes

References

External links

 2023 G7 presidency Japan
 2022 G7 presidency Germany
 2021 G7 presidency UK
 G7/8 Information Centre – University of Toronto
 EU Position on G7

 
Intergovernmental organizations
International economic organizations
Economic country classifications
20th-century diplomatic conferences
21st-century diplomatic conferences (Global)
Organizations established in 1975